Siegel High School is a public high school in the Rutherford County School System in Tennessee.  The Principal, Mr. Larry Creasy, has been the head of the administrative staff since 2014.

Siegel High School opened in the fall of 2003.  The Siegel school complex also includes Siegel Middle School and Siegel Elementary school.  The complex is situated on land gifted to Rutherford County by Richard Siegel through his will.

Siegel High School Football 
The Stars football team plays at Ken Nolan Stadium, named after the first principal of the school. The team has had many players play football at the next level, including one NFL Draft Pick (Montori Hughes).

Accomplishments
 2012 District 7AAA Champions
 2012 Perfect Regular Season (10–0)

Siegel High School Wrestling 
The Stars wrestling team competes in District 10 - Region 5 of the Tennessee Secondary School Athletic Association. The team has had numerous Region Champions, State Medalist, and one State Champion. The Stars also claimed back to back District titles in 2015 and 2016 while winning the Region 5 Dual Championship in 2015.

Siegel High School Band

Accomplishments

 The Siegel High School Marching Band is the 2009, 2010, and 2011 Tennessee State Marching Band Champion and the Grand Champion at the MTSU Contest of Champions.
 The only band to be awarded the Tennessee Marching Treble; The Chancellor's Cup at the Vanderbilt Marching Invitational, the Mayor's Cup at the Music City Invitational, and the Tennessee Governor's Cup at MTSU's Contest of Champions during a single season (2010).
 2006 Symphonic Band Appearance and Superior rating in Grade 6 at the National Adjudicators Invitational Grand National Concert Band Festival.
 The Siegel High School Marching Band placed 39th at BOA Grand Nationals in Indy.

References

External links
Siegel High School website
Siegel High School Band website
Siegel High Wrestling website

Educational institutions in the United States with year of establishment missing
Public high schools in Tennessee
Buildings and structures in Murfreesboro, Tennessee
Schools in Rutherford County, Tennessee